The 2016 season is Chainat Hornbill's 5th season in the Thai Premier League since 2012.

Players

First team squad

Out on loan

Thai Premier League
Toyota Thai Premier League

Thai League Cup
Toyota League Cup

External links
 Chainat Hornbill FC Official Website
  Chainat Hornbill FC Official Facebook
 Thaileague Official Website

Thai football clubs 2016 season
Association football in Thailand lists